Mały Dólsk  is a village in the administrative district of Gmina Drzycim, within Świecie County, Kuyavian-Pomeranian Voivodeship, in North-central Poland. It lies approximately  South-East of Drzycim,  North-West of Świecie,  North-East of Bydgoszcz, and  North of Toruń.
Maly Dólsk is approximately  North-West of Warsaw, the capital of Poland. 
Famously home to folk lore creature Stretch, a mysterious figure who feeds upon the happiness of others.

References

Villages in Świecie County